Rothstein is a Germanic-language (German, Yiddish) surname of several possible origins: toponymic surname from a place with the same name near Merseburg; from a Germanic personal name, Hrodstein (hrod- (Hróð-), "fame", "glory", meaning "famous stone").  Ashkenazic Jewish / Yiddish: ornamental compound surname: rot ‘red’ + Stein ‘stone’, akin to "Rotstein".

Notable people with the surname include:

Andrew Rothstein (1898–1994), Russian-British journalist
Arnold Rothstein (1882–1928), New York businessman and gambler, who became a famous kingpin of organized crime
Arthur Rothstein (1915–1985), American photographer
Joseph Rothstein (1917–1966) Past President of East Meadow Jewish Center, 
Bo Rothstein (born 1954), Swedish political scientist
Debbie Rothstein, voice actress
Edward Rothstein, American music critic and composer 
Henry Rothstein, academic at King's College London
 Israel Rothstein, birth name of  Israel Eliraz (1936–2016), Israeli poet 
Jesse Rothstein, economics professor at the University of California, Berkeley
Marshall Rothstein (born 1940), Puisne Justice of the Supreme Court of Canada
Mikael Rothstein (born 1961), Danish writer and historian
Ron Rothstein (born 1942), basketball coach
Theodore Rothstein (1871–1953), emigre journalist and writer in Great Britain, later ambassador of the Soviet Union
Richard Rothstein (academic), American historian and social scientist

Fictional characters
Albert Rothstein, a comic book superhero
John Rothstein, a writer from Stephen King's novel Finders Keepers
Sam "Ace" Rothstein, a gambler in the movie Casino

See also

Rostagnus

References

Jewish surnames
Yiddish-language surnames
German-language surnames